The Surveyor-General of New South Wales is the primary government authority responsible for land and mining surveying in New South Wales.

The original duties for the Surveyor General was to measure and determine land grants for settlers in New South Wales.

The Surveyor General is the leader and regulator of the land and mining surveying profession and plays a key advocacy role in the spatial industry in NSW
 Responsibilities under the Surveying & Spatial Information Act & its Regulation
 Surveyor General's Directions
 President of the Board of Surveying and Spatial Information (BOSSI)
 Chair of the Geographical Names Board (GNB)
 NSW representative on the Intergovernmental Committee for Surveying & Mapping (ICSM)
 Electoral Boundaries Commissioner (State & Federal)
 Sets the quality, education and competency standards for registered land and mining surveyors
 Responsible for protecting the public and the integrity of the state cadastre by suspension or removal of registered surveyors in relation to misconduct or incompetence
 Responsible for the DFSI Spatial Services Survey Operations team (Geodesy, State control survey, CORSnet-NSW, SCIMS)

List of Surveyors General of New South Wales

References

External links
Lists of British, Australian and New Zealand Surveyors-General, Government Geologists...
The Surveyor General's cartographic and related records — State Records NSW
Australian Dictionary of Biography Surveyor-General search